Nostoceratidae is a diverse family of heteromorph ammonites found throughout the oceans of the world during the Late Cretaceous.  The nostoceratids are famous for the bizarre coiling of their shells.  Many genera, such as Yezoceras, Ainoceras, Anaklinoceras, and some species of Bostrychoceras and Eubostrychoceras, display, as young shells at least, a helical coiling very similar to the shells of the related family, Turrilitidae.  As adults, though, the coils then curve away from the axis of coiling, either as an oxbow-like curve around the juvenile coils as in  Ainoceras and Anaklinoceras, or in a simple curved loop beneath the juvenile coils, as in Yezoceras.  Other genera form loose coils, sometimes in a spiral, such as those of Madagascarites, Muramotoceras, Hyphantoceras, and the infamously convolute Nipponites.

The ecology of nostoceratids is the subject of continued speculation, as the bizarrely coiled shells have no streamlining, strongly suggesting that the living animals had extraordinarily poor swimming ability, if any ability at all.  As such, experts and ammonite enthusiasts presume that the nostoceratids either floated passively in the water column, or were bottom-dwellers that may or may not have crawled on the seafloor.

The nostoceratids, as with all other Cretaceous ammonites, perished during the Cretaceous–Paleogene extinction event.

References

External links
Scientific report on the functional morphology of Cretaceous heteromorph ammonites

 
Ammonitida families
Cretaceous ammonites
Turrilitoidea
Late Cretaceous first appearances
Maastrichtian extinctions